Individual jumping equestrian at the 2014 Asian Games was held in Dream Park Equestrian Venue, Incheon, South Korea from September 28 to September 30, 2014.

Schedule
All times are Korea Standard Time (UTC+09:00)

Results
Legend
EL — Eliminated
WD — Withdrawn

Qualifier

Final round A

Final round B

References

External links
Official website

Individual jumping